Lee Deok-hwa (born May 8, 1952) is a South Korean actor.

Career
Lee Deok-hwa studied theater and film at Dongguk University, and made his acting debut in 1972. He and his father, movie star Lee Ye-chun starred together in the 1975 horror film The Man with Two Faces.

In 1976, Lee and actress Im Ye-jin starred in Never Forget Me and I Am Really Sorry, both movies in the "Really Really" series that dealt with teenagers' aspirations and romance. They were box office hits, and hugely popular among high school students of that generation. Lee had previously acted opposite Im in Red Shoes (1975) and continued to do so in Blue Classroom (1976), I've Never Felt Like This Before (1976), Angry Apple (1977), When We Grow Up... (1977), The First Snow (1977), The Hey Days of Youth 77 (1979), and Love's Scribble (1988).

Lee received acting recognition for his subsequent films, including three Best Actor awards from the Grand Bell Awards for Lost Love (also known as In the Name of Memory, 1989), Fly High Run Far (1991), and I Will Survive (1993). Lee also became the first Korean actor to win an award at an international film festival in 1993 when he was chosen as Best Actor at the Moscow International Film Festival for I Will Survive.

On the small screen, Lee won the prestigious Daesang (or "Grand Prize") for the contemporary drama Love and Ambition (1987) and period epic Han Myung-hoe (1994). The latter is among the many real-life historical figures that Lee has played in his prolific career, including Joseon prime minister Han Myung-hoe in Han Myung-hoe (1994), Goryeo military dictator Yi Ui-min in Age of Warriors (2003), Tang Dynasty general Xue Rengui in Dae Jo Yeong (2006), Goryeo military commander Gang Gam-chan in Empress Cheonchu (2009), and King Dongmyeong of Goguryeo in The King of Legend (2010).

In 2005, Lee played Chun Doo-hwan in the television drama 5th Republic, in an ongoing series on MBC about modern Korean political history. The Fifth Republic stands for the period that Chun was in power as president, depicting how he assumed power through a military coup and was forced to resign after a series of democratic movements. The drama was controversial and provoked mixed reactions. Some viewers complained that Lee's charismatic turn as Chun was an attempt to beautify or whitewash the image of the dictator, whereas former aides of Chun accused MBC of distorting history.

He reunited with Dae Jo Yeong writer Jang Young-chul in 2010 hit drama Giant, set during the economic boom of 1970-80s Korea. He again joined Jang's follow-up along with former co-star Lee Beom-soo in the 2012 drama History of a Salaryman. The series is set upon a quirky comedy and satire of China's Chu–Han Contention against the backdrop of the pharmaceutical industry, industrial espionage, and office politics.

In 2013, Lee received glowing reviews for his turn as King Injo in the period drama Blooded Palace: The War of Flowers, shown on cable channel jTBC. At a press conference prior to airing, Lee said, "Injo is a king who acceded to the throne due to revolutionary force. He had no philosophy of his own and was just a puppet king. It is more interesting for me to portray a king that we are unfamiliar with."

Lee also hosts variety shows, notably the Korean version of Dancing with the Stars for the past three seasons.

Other activities
Lee was president of the Korea Film Actors Association in 1995, and its chairman from 2009 to 2010. He also served as festival director for the Chungmuro International Film Festival in Seoul (CHFFIS) from 2008 to 2009.

Lee ran for Congress in 1996 under the conservative New Korea Party, predecessor of the Grand National Party, but was defeated.

He actively campaigned for Lee Myung-bak during the 2007 primaries and presidential election, making speeches at sorties and taking an advisory post for the team's art and culture policy.

In 2009, Lee, Cho Jae-hyun, Choi Soo-jong, Sol Kyung-gu, Kim Hye-soo, Ahn Sung-ki and Park Joong-hoon each taught a master class in acting at the Im Kwon-taek Film and Art College of Dongseo University. All of them then waived their lecturing fees and donated the entire amount to scholarships for young actors. Lee said he willingly accepted the request to teach because he wanted to contribute to training talented film experts for the future of the Korean film industry, and that he was happy to donate his fee to that cause.

Personal life
Lee's father is actor  (1919–1977). His daughter  is also an actress.

Filmography

Film

Television series

Variety shows

Radio programs

Book 
 사람을 좋아하는 사람 이덕화 (1996)

Awards and nominations

References

External links 
 
 
 

South Korean television presenters
South Korean male television actors
South Korean male film actors
Dongguk University alumni
1952 births
Living people
People from Seoul
Male actors from Seoul
Yi clan of Yonan
South Korean Buddhists